Tarik Darreh-ye Pain (also Romanized as Tārīk Darreh-ye Pā'īn; also known as Deh-e Kabūd and Tārīk Darreh-ye Soflá) is a village in Khezel-e Sharqi Rural District, Khezel District, Nahavand County, Hamadan Province, Iran. At the 2006 census, its population was 110, in 29 families.

References 

Populated places in Nahavand County